Gao Yang (born 1 March 1993) is a Chinese athlete specialising in the shot put. She finished fifth at the 2015 World Championships in Beijing. In addition she won several medals on continental level and the silver at the 2012 World Junior Championships.

Her personal bests in the event are 19.20 metres outdoors (Neubrandenburg 2016) and 18.77 metres indoors (Birmingham 2018).

Competition record

References

1993 births
Living people
Chinese female shot putters
World Athletics Championships athletes for China
Place of birth missing (living people)
Athletes (track and field) at the 2016 Summer Olympics
Athletes (track and field) at the 2018 Asian Games
Olympic athletes of China
Asian Games silver medalists for China
Asian Games medalists in athletics (track and field)
Medalists at the 2018 Asian Games
Athletes (track and field) at the 2020 Summer Olympics
21st-century Chinese women